Eusirus holmi is a species of amphipod in the family Eusiridae.

References

Gammaridea
Crustaceans described in 1887